The Alabama–Florida League was a low-level circuit in American minor league baseball that existed from 1936 through 1939 and 1951 through 1962. In 1940–1941 and from 1946–1950. The absence of clubs based in Florida caused the league to change its name to the Alabama State League.

History
The Alabama–Florida League was founded in 1936. In 1940 the league changed its name to the Alabama State League. In 1951, the Alabama State League switched its name back to the Alabama–Florida. The Alabama–Florida League played 12 more seasons after reforming. The Alabama–Florida  League was a Class D level league for its duration.

The Class D loop's longest serving members included clubs in Andalusia, Brewton, Dothan, Enterprise, Greenville, Ozark and Troy, all in Alabama, and the Florida cities of Fort Walton Beach, Graceville and Panama City.

Montgomery, Alabama, the largest city to be represented in the league, was a member for six seasons (1957–1962).

In , the league's final year, the Pensacola Senators, a Washington Senators farm club managed by Wayne Terwilliger, won the pennant by 22 games and led the league in attendance. It was the only Alabama–Florida League team to post a winning record.

Alabama–Florida League teams

 Abbeville, AL: Abbeville Red Sox 1936 ** The team disbanded on August 10, 1936  
 Andalusia, AL: Andalusia Reds 1936; Andalusia Bulldogs 1937–1938; Andalusia Rams 1939; Andalusia Arrows 1953; Andalusia-Opp Indians 1954; Andalusia Dodgers 1962 (** The Dodgers moved to Ozark on July 10, 1962) 
 Columbus, GA: Columbus Foxes 1958 
 Crestview, FL: Crestview Braves 1954–1956 
 Donalsonville, GA: Donalsonville Indians 1955; Donalsonville Seminoles 1956 
 Dothan, AL: Dothan Boll Weevils 1936; Dothan Browns 1937–1939; Dothan Browns 1951–1952; Dothan Rebels 1953–1954; Dothan Cardinals 1955–1956; Dothan Cardinals 1958–1960; Dothan Phillies 1961–1962 
 Enterprise, AL: Enterprise Browns 1936; Enterprise Boll Weevils 1951–1952 (** The Boll Weevils moved to Graceville on July 5, 1952) 
 Eufaula, AL: Eufaula Millers 1952–1953 
 Evergreen, AL: Evergreen Greenies 1937–1938 (** The team moved from Ozark at start of 1937 season's second half on June 29, 1937)  
 Fort Walton Beach, FL: Fort Walton Beach Jets 1953–1962 
 Graceville, FL: Graceville Boll Weevils 1952; Graceville Oilers 1953–1958 (** The Boll Weevils moved from Enterprise on July 5, 1952) 

 Greenville, AL: Greenville Lions 1939 
 Headland, AL: Headland Dixie Runners 1951–1952 
 Montgomery, AL: Montgomery Rebels 1957–1962 
 Ozark, AL: Ozark Cardinals 1936–1937; Ozark Eagles 1951–1952; Ozark Dodgers 1962 (** The Cardinals moved to Evergreen at start of 1937 season's second half on June 29, 1937. The Dodgers moved from Andalusia on July 10, 1962) 
 Panama City, FL: Panama City Papermakers 1936; Panama City Pelicans 1937–1939; Panama City Fliers 1951–1961 
 Pensacola, FL: Pensacola Dons 1957–1959; Pensacola Angels 1960; Pensacola Senators 1961–1962 
 Selma, AL: Selma Cloverleafs 1957–1962 
 Tallahassee, FL: Tallahassee Citizens 1951 
 Tallassee, AL: Tallassee Indians 1939 
 Troy, AL: Troy Trojans 1936–1939 
 Union Springs, AL: Union Springs Springers 1936–1937; Union Springs Red Birds 1938

Alabama–Florida League champions

1936: Andalusia Reds
1937: Andalusia Bulldogs
1938: Troy Trojans
1939: Tallassee Indians
1951: Dothan Browns
1952: Ozark Eagles
1953: Dothan Rebels
1954: Graceville Oilers
1955: Panama City Fliers
1956: Donalsonville Seminoles
1957: Graceville Oilers
1958: Dothan Cardinals
1959: Selma Cloverleafs
1960: Pensacola Angels
1961: Selma Cloverleafs
1962: Pensacola Senators

Alabama State League teams

Andalusia Arrows
Andalusia Rams
Brewton Millers
Dothan Browns
Enterprise Boll Weevils
Geneva Red Birds
Greenville Lions
Greenville Pirates
Headland Dixie Runners
Ozark Eagles
Troy Dodgers
Troy Tigers
Troy Trojans
Tuskegee Airmen

External links
Deep South Class D Baseball Web Site

References
Johnson, Lloyd and Wolff, Miles, ed., The Encyclopedia of Minor League Baseball. Durham, North Carolina: Baseball America, 1997.

Defunct minor baseball leagues in the United States
Baseball leagues in Florida
Baseball leagues in Alabama
Sports leagues established in 1936
Sports leagues disestablished in 1962
1936 disestablishments in the United States
1962 disestablishments in the United States